Fissicrambus minuellus is a moth in the family Crambidae. It was described by Francis Walker in 1863. It is found in Honduras, Cuba, Puerto Rico and Florida.

References

Crambini
Moths described in 1863
Moths of North America